Vaccinium arctostaphylos or Caucasian whortleberry is a species of shrub with edible fruit of blue color. It is native to Western Asia (Iran and Turkey), the Caucasus (Armenia; Azerbaijan; Georgia; Russia), and Southeastern Europe (Bulgaria).

Medicinal effects
In a study on 50 hyperlipidaemic adult patients, an extract of the fruit of Vaccinium arctostaphylos was found to have beneficial effects on serum lipid profile and oxidative stress. Each medicinal capsule contained 45 ± 2 mg of anthocyanins. The authors suggest that the effects may be due to the anthocyanin content of the fruit.

References

External links
 Carl Linnaeus (1753) Species Plantarum, Tomus I: .

arctostaphylos
Flora of Western Asia
Flora of Armenia
Flora of Azerbaijan
Flora of Bulgaria
Flora of Georgia (country)
Flora of Iran
Flora of Russia
Flora of the Caucasus
Plants described in 1753
Taxa named by Carl Linnaeus